Gabriël Pieter 'Gawie' Visagie  (31 March 1955 – 19 November 2014) was a South African rugby union footballer.

Playing career
Visagie was born in Vereeniging, Gauteng, but finished his schooling in Kimberley in the Northern Cape at HTS Kimberley and was selected to represent Griqualand West at the annual Craven Week tournament in 1973. In 1974 he moved to Pretoria for his two years of National service and played for the Northern Transvaal under–20 team. In 1976 he was back in the Northern Cape to work at the Associated Manganese Mines of South Africa Limited (AMMOSAL), now called Assmang Proprietary Limited. Visagie made his Provincial debut for Griqualand West in 1977 and played 39 games for the union.

In 1981 Visagie re-located to Natal and played for Natal until 1985. He was also part of the team that unexpectedly reaches the Currie Cup Final in 1984. Visagie toured with the Springboks to New Zealand in 1981. He did not play in any test matches for the Springboks, but played in three tour matches, scoring two tries.

Accolades
Visagie, along with Darius Botha, Willie du Plessis, Doug Jeffrey and Andre Markgraaff, was named one of the five SA Rugby Young players of the year for 1979.

Death
Visagie died on the 19th of November 2014 after a long battle with cancer.

See also
List of South Africa national rugby union players – Springbok no. 530

References

1955 births
2014 deaths
South African rugby union players
South Africa international rugby union players
Griquas (rugby union) players
People from Vereeniging
Rugby union players from Gauteng
Sharks (Currie Cup) players
Rugby union scrum-halves